This article shows the rosters of all participating teams at the 2006 FIVB Volleyball Women's World Championship in Japan.

The following is the Azerbaijani roster in the 2006 FIVB Volleyball Women's World Championship.

The following is the Brazilian roster in the 2006 FIVB Volleyball Women's World Championship.

The following is the Cameroonian roster in the 2006 FIVB Volleyball Women's World Championship.

The following is the Chinese roster in the 2006 FIVB Volleyball Women's World Championship.

The following is the Costa Rican roster in the 2006 FIVB Volleyball Women's World Championship.

The following is the Cuban roster in the 2006 FIVB Volleyball Women's World Championship.

The following is the Taiwanese roster in the 2006 FIVB Volleyball Women's World Championship.

The following is the Dominican Republic roster in the 2006 FIVB Volleyball Women's World Championship.

The following is the Egyptian roster in the 2006 FIVB Volleyball Women's World Championship.

The following is the German roster in the 2006 FIVB Volleyball Women's World Championship.

The following is the Italian roster in the 2006 FIVB Volleyball Women's World Championship.

The following is the Japanese roster in the 2006 FIVB Volleyball Women's World Championship.

The following is the Kazakhstani roster in the 2006 FIVB Volleyball Women's World Championship.

The following is the Kenyan roster in the 2006 FIVB Volleyball Women's World Championship.

The following is the Mexican roster in the 2006 FIVB Volleyball Women's World Championship.

The following is the Dutch roster in the 2006 FIVB Volleyball Women's World Championship.

The following is the Peruvian roster in the 2006 FIVB Volleyball Women's World Championship.

The following is the Polish roster in the 2006 FIVB Volleyball Women's World Championship.

The following is the Puerto Rican roster in the 2006 FIVB Volleyball Women's World Championship.

The following is the Russian roster in the 2006 FIVB Volleyball Women's World Championship.

The following is the Serbia and Montenegro roster in the 2006 FIVB Volleyball Women's World Championship.

The following is the South Korean roster in the 2006 FIVB Volleyball Women's World Championship.

The following is the Turkish roster in the 2006 FIVB Volleyball Women's World Championship.

The following is the American roster in the 2006 FIVB Volleyball Women's World Championship.

See also
2006 FIVB Volleyball Men's World Championship squads

References

External links
Official website

S
FIVB Volleyball Women's World Championship squads